The formal Thai national costume, known in Thai as  (literally 'Thai dress of royal endorsement'), includes several sets of clothing, or chut thai, designed for use as national costume on formal occasions. Although described and intended for use as national costume, they are of relatively modern origins, having been conceived in the second half of the twentieth century.

Formal chut thai for men

The men's national costume is known as suea phraratchathan (lit. 'royally bestowed shirt'). It was designed to serve as a national costume by royal tailors including Chupat Chuto, Phichai Watsanasong, and Sompop Louilarpprasert for King Bhumibol Adulyadej in 1979, and was subsequently given to General Prem Tinsulanonda, then the Minister of Defense, to promote and wear in public. Prem remained the shirt's most recognised wearer, although it has been adopted by many, especially politicians and civil officials, on special occasions. Many have begun wearing the shirt for ceremonies such as their own weddings.

The shirt shares the appearance of the raj pattern jacket, which itself is an older widely adopted (in Thailand) version of the Nehru jacket. The suea phraratchathan is specified as having a standing (Mandarin) collar 3.5 to 4 centimetres in height, being slightly tapered at the sides, hemmed at the edges of the collar, placket and sleeves, with five round flat buttons covered with a material identical or similar to that of the shirt. It should have two outer pockets at the front, at a level slightly higher than the lowermost button, may have a left-sided breast pocket, and may either be vented or not. The shirt comes in three varieties: short-sleeved, long-sleeved, and long-sleeved with a sash, which range from the least to most formal, respectively. The long-sleeved versions should have 4 to 5 centimetres-wide cuffs of the same material as the shirt, and the sash, when used, should be knotted at the left side. The shirt is worn with trousers as would be with a suit jacket.

Formal chut thai for women

When Queen Sirikit accompanied the king in state visits to Europe and the United States in 1960, she noted that there was a need for a modern national costume suitable for formal wear. The queen had research conducted into historical records of royal dresses, and eight official designs were developed and promoted by the queen and her aides. They are named the Ruean Ton, Chit Lada, Amarin, Borom Phiman, Chakkri, Dusit, Chakkraphat and Siwalai Thai dresses. Since then, these dresses have come into regular use by the public as well.

Chut Thai Chakkri
Chut Thai Chakkri is a formal and elegant wear, normally produced using a weaving technique called "yok". Yok creates additional thickness within the fabric without adding supplementary threads. Often a touch of gold or silver-colored threads are added, making the fabric produced this way particularly more expensive.  The chut thai is finished with a sinh, a full length wrap-around skirt with two pleated folds in the front called "na nang".

Chut Thai Boromphiman
Chut Thai Boromphiman, also a formal evening attire, comprises a long sleeved blouse which is either buttoned at the front or the back. The blouse is tucked beneath a sinh with its front pleats (na nang). The fabric is brocaded to create a highly luxurious look and feel. The collar of the blouse is round-necked. The sinh length runs about the ankle. The skirt and blouse are sewn together like a one piece dress of which style is suitable for a tall and slender wearer. It can be worn in either formal or semi-formal events such as the League Ceremony or royal functions. Royal decorations are also worn.

Chut Thai Dusit
Chut Thai Dusit is evening attire, wide necked and sleeveless brocaded dress. The skirt and stop are sewn together so that they form a one piece dress. For this kind of dress, yok silk fabric is used. It is worn for evening ceremonies in place of a Western style dress.

Chut Thai Siwalai
Chut Thai Siwalai, a formal evening chut thai, is quite similar to Thai Boromphiman, but has an over-shoulder sbai. It is worn for royal ceremonies or formal functions.

Chut Thai Chakkraphat
Chut Thai Chakkraphat is a chut thai with a shawl like Thai Chakkri. However, it is more conservative and considered more official. The upper part has a pleated shawl cover, a thicker shawl with full embroidery on the upper shawl. It can be worn for royal or national ceremonies.

Chut Thai Amarin
Chut Thai Amarin is evening attire, made of brocaded fabric. With this style, the wearer does not have to wear a belt. The blouse can be wide and round-necked.  The sleeve length sits just below the elbow. The beauty of this chut thai is its textile and accessories. It can be used for an evening dinner or at the Royal Birthday Procession. The royal decorations are worn.

Chut Thai Chitlada
Chut Thai Chitlada, with its brocaded band at the hem of the sinh, is a daytime ceremonial dress. It can be worn with a long sleeved silk blouse, with the front opening attached with five ornamental silver or gold buttons. The sinh is a casual wraparound. It can be worn to a ceremony that is a not too informal such as welcoming the official royal guests at the airport. Wearers do not need to wear royal decorations but the color and style should be appropriate.

Chut Thai Ruean Ton
Chut Thai Ruean Ton is the most casual clothing of all outfits. It comprises a horizontally or vertically striped silk or plain-coloured sinh with a patterned band at the tin sinh, or the hem, sometimes folded to one side, The collarless blouse that goes with it is separated from the ankle-length skirt. The sleeves are elbow length, and the blouse has a front opening. It is suitable for casual and non-official functions such as Kathin Ton, a religious ceremony of the conferring of royal offerings to monks.

See also
Chong kraben
Chut thai
Raj pattern
Sampot
Sbai
Sinh
Xout lao

References

Thai clothing
Thai
History of Asian clothing